Novel is the second album released by singer Joey Pearson. This second album of Pearson's has one of his songs from his debut album, Don't Give Up, which was extended and remixed for the new album. It also contains a version of Stevie Wonder's Living for the City.

Track listing
"More Than a Friend"    
"You're My Everything"    
"Living for the City"    
"Novel"    
"Noah's Song"    
"Once Again"    
"Don't Give Up 2003"    
"Something to Say 2003 Remix"    
"God Bless America"    
"Star Spangled Banner"

2003 albums
Joey Pearson albums